Gimme Back My Bullets is the fourth studio album by American Southern rock band Lynyrd Skynyrd, released on February 2, 1976. It reached number 20 on the U.S. albums chart and was certified gold on January 20, 1981, by the RIAA.

The album was originally titled Ain't No Dowd About It, in tribute to the producer Tom Dowd whom the band idolized.

Record World said the title track had "a sinewy, guita -heavy number sound the group is most comfortable with," and said that "the beat is reminiscent of Bad Company and rocks with a stormy aggression."

Track listing 

 Sides one and two were combined as tracks 1–9 on CD reissues.

Tracks 10 and 11 are previously unreleased

Tracks 10 and 14 originally released on the Lynyrd Skynyrd (Box Set) (1991)
Track 15 originally released on Skynyrd's Innyrds (1989)
Track 11 is previously unreleased

All tracks recorded live for The Old Grey Whistle Test on BBC television on November 11, 1975.

Personnel 
Lynyrd Skynyrd
Ronnie Van Zant – lead vocals, lyrics
Gary Rossington – guitars
Allen Collins – guitars
Leon Wilkeson – bass, background vocals
Artimus Pyle – drums, percussion
Billy Powell – keyboards

Additional personnel
The Honeycuts – background vocals ("Double Trouble", "Cry for the Bad Man")
The Honkettes – background vocals (on bonus live tracks)
Lee Freeman – harp ("I Got the Same Old Blues")
Barry Lee Harwood – dobro, mandolin ("All I Can Do Is Write About It")

Chart positions

Certifications

References 

1976 albums
Albums produced by Tom Dowd
Lynyrd Skynyrd albums
MCA Records albums